Duncan Sinclair may refer to:

 Duncan Sinclair (Conservative politician) (1869–1951), Conservative member of the Canadian House of Commons
 Duncan James Sinclair (1867–1943), Liberal party member of the Canadian House of Commons
 Duncan G. Sinclair (born 1933), American-born Canadian academic